Hans Kristian Rausing (born 15 June 1963) is a Swedish billionaire and the son of packaging industrialist Hans Rausing. His grandfather Ruben Rausing founded the food-packaging giant Tetra Pak. The family has an estimated $12 billion fortune.

Rausing did not enter the family business. Instead, he travelled in his youth before meeting Eva Kemeny while in drug rehabilitation in the United States. On 16 October 1992, the couple married. In common with other members of the Rausing family, they settled in London (and Barbados), and donated millions of pounds to charities, in particular those concerned with drug awareness and addiction prevention. They built and funded a rehabilitation centre on the Caribbean island of Barbados.

In April 2008, Rausing and his wife were arrested on drugs charges after Mrs Rausing allegedly tried to take small amounts of crack cocaine and heroin into the United States embassy in London. Quantities of crack cocaine and heroin were then found in their home. They were charged with possession of a large amount of cocaine and smaller quantities of crack, heroin and cannabis after a Scotland Yard investigation. They admitted possessing Class A drugs (cocaine and heroin) and received a police caution.

On 10 July 2012 Rausing was arrested on suspicion of possessing class A drugs, after which his wife Eva Rausing was found dead at the couple's Belgravia home. Rausing failed to report his wife's death for two months. On 17 July 2012, he was charged with delaying burial of her body. He pleaded guilty and received a suspended sentence. The couple had four children.

He married Julia Delves Broughton, daughter of Sir Evelyn Delves Broughton, 12th Bt and sister of Isabella Blow, in June 2014.

References 

1963 births
Living people
Criminals from London
People from Lund
Swedish billionaires
British billionaires
Swedish philanthropists
Philanthropists from London
Swedish emigrants to the United Kingdom
Hans Kristian